The table below lists information technology initialisms and acronyms in common and current usage. These acronyms are used to discuss LAN, internet, WAN, routing and switching protocols, and their applicable organizations. The table contains only current, common, non-proprietary initialisms that are specific to information technology. Most of these initialisms appear in IT career certification exams such as CompTIA A+.

See also
 List of computing and IT abbreviations

References

Information technology
Information technology acronyms